"Choices (Yup)" (also titled simply as "Choices") is a song by American rapper E-40. It is the second single from his 21st studio album Sharp On All 4 Corners: Corner 1 (2014).

Content 
In the song's hook, E-40 generalizes that every person has choices to make, and that he is getting money. In the verses he presents scenarios and/or questions and then gives his own answer, with it being either "yup" or "nope".

Remixes 
E-40 released a remix of the song on April 29, 2015, which has different lyrics that are in honor of Golden State Warriors. In 2016, the song was parodied in a new commercial by DriveTime, a used car dealership network.

Charts

References 

E-40 songs
Songs written by E-40
2014 songs
2014 singles